"Rocky Top" is a song written by Felice and Boudleaux Bryant in 1967.  It may also refer to:
 Rocky Top (Georgia), a summit
 Rocky Top, Tennessee, a town formerly named Lake City, Tennessee that in June 2014 changed its name to "Rocky Top"
 Rocky Top Raceway, a dirt race track located in  Lawrence County, Ohio